Salubria is a historic plantation house located at Stevensburg, Culpeper County, Virginia. It was built about 1742, and is a two-story, hipped roof dwelling with two large corbel-capped chimneys on the interior ends. Salubria was the birthplace of Admiral Cary Travers Grayson, personal physician to President Woodrow Wilson. In October 2000, Salubria was donated by the Grayson family to the Germanna Foundation for historic preservation.

It was listed on the National Register of Historic Places in 1970.

References

External links

Salubria, Salubria Lane, Stevensburg, Culpeper County, VA: 17 photos, 10 measured drawings, and 2 photo caption pages at Historic American Buildings Survey

Historic American Buildings Survey in Virginia
Plantation houses in Virginia
Houses on the National Register of Historic Places in Virginia
Houses completed in 1742
Houses in Culpeper County, Virginia
National Register of Historic Places in Culpeper County, Virginia
1742 establishments in Virginia